Darren McGarvey, who goes by the stage name Loki, is a Scottish rapper, hip hop recording artist, and social commentator. He was an activist during the Scottish independence referendum in 2014.  He is from a political and performance family: his aunt is the former MSP Rosie McGarvey Kane.

Career
McGarvey was brought up in Pollok on the south side of Glasgow. Between 2004 and 2006, he wrote and presented eight programmes about the causes of anti-social behaviour and social deprivation for BBC Radio Scotland. McGarvey worked with youth organisation Volition, teaching young people to rap. In 2012 he led a workshop as part of a PowerRap competition for schools, encouraging young people to explore important issues through music and language.

McGarvey studied journalism at Glasgow Clyde College.  In 2009, he was part of the Poverty Truth Commission hosted in Glasgow. 
In 2015 he had six months as rapper-in-residence with the Violence Reduction Unit.

In April 2016 McGarvey appeared in a documentary The Divide discussing his alcoholism and its impact on his life.

In October 2017 he claimed a lack of support for working class or deprived communities from Creative Scotland, the main body that funds Scotland's arts companies and artists.  He also admitted he had not tried to apply for Creative Scotland funds.

Loki's Poverty Safari won the 2018 Orwell Prize for books, with the judges saying it "was 'exactly the book' that Orwell would have wanted to win".

In December 2022, McGarvey gave a speech on "Freedom from Want" as one of four Reith Lectures for the BBC based on US President Franklin D. Roosevelt's "Four Freedoms" 1941 State of the Union address.

Works

Discography 
 Government Issue Music Protest (GIMP) (2014), a science-fiction concept album with significant contributions from singer-songwriter Becci Wallace which enjoyed some critical acclaim. The album describes a dystopian vision of Scotland in the year 2034.
 Trigger Warning (2017), a concept album through which he attempts to explore various issues, expressed as a story.

Bibliography
 Poverty Safari: Understanding the Anger of Britain's Underclass, Luath Press, 2017 
 in German: Transl. Klaus Berr, Armutssafari. Von der Wut der abgehängten Unterschicht. Luchterhand, Munich 2019
 The Social Distance Between Us: How Remote Politics Wrecked Britain, Ebury Press, 2022

Television

 Darren McGarvey's Scotland - BBC Scotland - Darren 'Loki' McGarvey investigates the rise of poverty and inequality in Scotland 
 Darren McGarvey's Class Wars - BBC Scotland
 Darren McGarvey's Addictions - BBC Scotland

References

External links
 Review of Poverty Safari

Musicians from Glasgow
Scottish radio personalities
Scottish male rappers
Living people
Place of birth missing (living people)
1984 births
Writers from Glasgow